Richard Evans Schultes (SHULL-tees; January 12, 1915 – April 10, 2001) was an American biologist. He may be considered the father of modern ethnobotany. He is known for his studies of the uses of plants by indigenous peoples, especially the indigenous peoples of the Americas. He worked on entheogenic or hallucinogenic plants, particularly in Mexico and the Amazon, involving lifelong collaborations with chemists. He had charismatic influence as an educator at Harvard University; several of his students and colleagues went on to write popular books and assume influential positions in museums, botanical gardens, and popular culture.

His book The Plants of the Gods: Their Sacred, Healing, and Hallucinogenic Powers (1979), co-authored with chemist Albert Hofmann, the discoverer of LSD,  is considered his greatest popular work: it has never been out of print and was revised into an expanded second edition, based on a German translation by Christian Rätsch (1998), in 2001.

Biography

Schultes was born in Boston; his father was a plumber. He grew up and was schooled in East Boston. His interest in South American rain forests traced back to his childhood: while he was bedridden, his parents read him excerpts of Notes of a Botanist on the Amazon and the Andes, by 19th century English botanist Richard Spruce.  He received a full scholarship to Harvard.

On entering Harvard in 1933, Schultes planned to pursue medicine.  However that changed after he took Biology 104, "Plants and Human Affairs," taught by orchidologist and Director of the Harvard Botanical Museum Oakes Ames. Ames became a mentor, and Schultes became an assistant in the Botanical Museum; his undergraduate senior thesis studied the ritual use of peyote cactus among the Kiowa of Oklahoma, and he obtained BA in Biology in 1937. Continuing at Harvard under Ames, he completed his Master of Arts in Biology in 1938 and his Ph.D. in Botany in 1941. Schultes' doctoral thesis investigated the lost identity of the Mexican hallucinogenic plants teonanácatl (mushrooms belonging to the genus Psilocybe) and ololiuqui (a morning glory species) in Oaxaca, Mexico.  He received a fellowship from the National Research Council to study the plants used to make curare.

The entry of the United States into World War II saw Schultes diverted to the search for wild disease-resistant Hevea rubber species in an effort to free the United States from dependence on Southeast Asian rubber plantations which had become unavailable owing to Japanese occupation. In early 1942, as a field agent for the governmental Rubber Development Corporation, Schultes began work on rubber and concurrently undertook research on Amazonian ethnobotany, under a Guggenheim Foundation Fellowship.

Schultes' botanical field-work among aboriginal American communities led him to be one of the first to alert the world about destruction of the Amazon rain-forest and the disappearance of its native people. He collected over thirty thousand herbarium specimens (including three hundred species new to Western science) and published numerous ethnobotanical discoveries including the source of the dart poison known as curare, now commonly employed as a muscle relaxant during surgery. He was the first non-native individual to academically examine ayahuasca, a hallucinogenic brew made out of Banisteriopsis caapi vine in combination with various plants; of which he identified Psychotria viridis (Chacruna) and Diplopterys cabrerana (Chaliponga), both of which contained a potent short-acting hallucinogen, N,N-Dimethyltryptamine (DMT). In his travels he lived with the indigenous peoples and viewed them with respect and felt that tribal chiefs were gentlemen; he understood the languages of the Witoto and Makuna peoples. He encountered dangers in his travels, including hunger, beriberi, repeated bouts of malaria, and near drowning.

Schultes became curator of Harvard's Oakes Ames Orchid Herbarium in 1953, curator of Economic Botany in 1958, and professor of biology in 1970.  His ever-popular undergraduate course on economic botany was noted for his Victorian demeanor, lectures delivered in a white lab coat, insistence on memorization of systematic botanical names, films depicting native ritual use of plant inebriants, blowgun demonstrations, and hands-on labs (using plant sources of grain, paper, caffeine, dyes, medicines, and tropical fruits). His composed and kindly persona and expressive eye gestures helped capture the imagination of the many students he inspired.

In 1959, Schultes married Dorothy Crawford McNeil, an opera soprano who performed in Europe and the United States. They had three children, Richard Evans Schultes II, and twins Alexandra Ames Schultes Wilson and Neil Parker Schultes. Schultes retired from Harvard in 1985. He was a member of King's Chapel church in Boston.  Despite his Germanic surname he was an anglophile. He would often vote for the Queen of the United Kingdom during presidential elections because he didn't support the American Revolution.

Influences

Schultes was led to study psychoactive drugs by Heinrich Kluver, a leading scholar of this subject (personal communication from Schultes). This interest evolved by way of Schultes' field observations on peyote, studying the peyote cult among the Plains Indians in his travels with Weston LaBarre in the early 1930s (in 1938, LaBarre based The Peyote Cult on these travels and observations).

In Western culture, Schultes' discoveries influenced writers who considered hallucinogens as the gateways to self-discovery, such as Aldous Huxley, William Burroughs and Carlos Castaneda. Although he contributed to the psychedelic era with his discoveries, he personally disdained its proponents, dismissing drug guru and fellow Harvard professor Timothy Leary for being so little versed in hallucinogenic species that he misspelled the Latin names of the plants. When Burroughs described his ayahuasca visions as an earth-shaking metaphysical experience, Schultes famously replied, "That's funny, Bill, all I saw was colors."

Schultes' personal hero was Richard Spruce, a British naturalist who spent seventeen years exploring the Amazon rainforest.

Schultes, in both his life and his work, has directly influenced notable people as diverse as biologist E.O. Wilson, physician Andrew Weil, psychologist Daniel Goleman, poet Allen Ginsberg, ethnobotanist, conservationist and author Mark Plotkin, and authors Alejo Carpentier, Mary Mackey, and William S. Burroughs.  Timothy Plowman, authority on the genus Erythroxylum (coca) and ethnobotanist, and  Wade Davis were his students at Harvard.

Distinctions
Schultes received numerous awards and decorations including:

  Gold Medal from the Linnean Society of London (1992), the most prestigious prize in botany;
  Gold Medal from the World Wildlife Fund.
  Golden Plate Award of the American Academy of Achievement (1988).
  Boyaca Cross (Cruz de Boyacá) 1986, highest award from the government of the Republic Of Colombia.

Schultes is one of the leading characters in the prestigious Colombian film El abrazo de la serpiente (Embrace of the Serpent) (2015), directed by Ciro Guerra and critically acclaimed. The film depicts Schultes' search for a mysterious plant through the Amazon jungle, and he was played by actor Brionne Davis. The film specifically credits both his diaries and those accounts of an earlier Amazonian explorer, the German scientist Theodor Koch-Grünberg.

In 1962 botanist Harold E. Moore published Resia, which is a genus of flowering plants from South America, in the family Gesneriaceae and named in his honour. Then in 1977, botanist Hunz. published Schultesianthus which is also a genus of flowering plants from South America, but belonging to the family Solanaceae and also named in Moore's honour.

Selected works

See also
 Ethnobiology
 Psychoactive plants
 List of psychoactive plants

Notes

External links

 Plotkin, Mark (2022). Richard Evans Schultes: Brief life of a pioneering ethnobotanist and conservationist: 1915-2001. Harvard Magazine
 Plotkin, Mark (2022). The Life of a Harvard Ethnobotanist: Richard Evans Schultes. Harvard Magazine. (Video)
 Audio of Richard Evans Schultes on Hallucinogenic Plants
 The Richard E. Schultes Research Award 
 Harvard Gazette
 
 A Tribute to Richard Schultes 
 American Ethnography -- The appeal of peyote (Lophophora Williamsii) as a medicine
 Photo of Richard E. Schultes 
 
 The Amazonian Travels of Richard Evans Schultes
 Luis Sequeira, "Richard Evans Schultes", Biographical Memoirs of the National Academy of Sciences (2006)

1915 births
2001 deaths
American botanists
Ethnobiologists
Ethnobotanists
Botanists active in South America
Psychedelic drug researchers
American psychedelic drug advocates
Harvard University alumni
Harvard University faculty
Fellows of the American Academy of Arts and Sciences
Members of the United States National Academy of Sciences